Italy Between the Arts and Sciences is a mural from 1935 by the Italian modernist painter Mario Sironi. The fresco forms the backdrop to the stage in the Great Hall of Sapienza University of Rome. The lower portion of the composition contains allegories of learning such as Astronomy, Mineralogy, Botany, Geography, Architecture, Letters, Painting and History. The upper section of the mural consists of Fascist iconography, showing Victory wielding a sword, the imperial eagle, and a triumphal arch decorated with a depiction of Mussolini on horseback. In 1950, a university commission decided to obscure the Fascist symbols, and these areas were repainted. In 2015, Sapienza University and the Central Institute of Restoration (Istituto Centrale per il Restauro) began work to restore the mural to its original appearance. The work was completed in 2017. The project was widely celebrated in the Italian press, and most commentators described any effort to cover the Fascist symbols as vandalism. Marina Righetti, a professor at Sapienza and one of the managers of the restoration, stated that any political controversy over the Fascist symbols would come from people who are "strangers to culture and do not understand the value of recovering a foundational artist of the twentieth century."

References 

Italian art
Arts in Italy
Murals